Anna Maria Hermansson (born 18 June 1969) is a Swedish biathlete. She competed in two events at the 1992 Winter Olympics.

References

External links
 

1969 births
Living people
Biathletes at the 1992 Winter Olympics
Swedish female biathletes
Olympic biathletes of Sweden
Place of birth missing (living people)